The following lists events that happened during 2007 in Cape Verde.

Incumbents
President: Pedro Pires
Prime Minister: José Maria Neves

Events
First publication of newspaper A Nação 
Cape Verde signed two UN conventions, the Convention on the Rights of Persons with Disabilities and the International Convention for the Protection of All Persons from Enforced Disappearance
November: Expansion of Rabil Airport (now Aristides Pereira International Airport) completed
December: desalination plant opened in Porto Novo, Santo Antão

Sports

Sporting Clube da Praia won the Cape Verdean Football Championship
Académica da Praia won the Taça Nacional de Cabo Verde

Deaths
João Vário (b. 1937), writer

References

 
Years of the 21st century in Cape Verde
2000s in Cape Verde
Cape Verde
Cape Verde